Fermoy is an abandoned townsite in McDavitt Township, Saint Louis County, Minnesota, United States. It was located near the communities of Sax and Kelsey. Fermoy was near the intersection of Kolu Road (County Road 207), Cranberry Lane (County Road 788), and Admiral Road South. Saint Louis County Highway 7 (CR 7) is nearby.

Fermoy was a station and junction of the Great Northern Railway, four miles north of Kelsey, in section 28, of McDavitt Township. Fermoy Wildlife Management Area is nearby.

References

Former populated places in St. Louis County, Minnesota
Former populated places in Minnesota
Ghost towns in Minnesota